The AZAL 2013–14 season was AZAL's ninth Azerbaijan Premier League season, in which they finished 8th in the League. They also participated in the Azerbaijan Cup, where they were defeated in the Second Round by Qarabağ. AZAL started the season under the management of Vagif Sadygov, but he was sacked on 16 March 2014 following their defeat to Neftchi Baku, and replaced the following day by former Neftchi Assistant Tarlan Ahmadov.

Squad

Out on loan

Transfers

Summer

In:

 

Out:

Winter

In:

 

.

 

Out:

Competitions

Friendlies

Azerbaijan Premier League

Results summary

Results by round

Results

League table

Azerbaijan Cup

Squad statistics

Appearances and goals

|-
|colspan="14"|Players who appeared for Ravan Baku no longer at the club:

|}

Goal scorers

Disciplinary record

References

External links 
 AZAL PFC Official Web Site
 AZAL PFC  at PFL.AZ
 AZAL PFC Official Facebook Page

AZAL
AZAL PFC seasons